Stares and Whispers was Freda Payne's seventh American released album appearing in 1977; it was also her first for Capitol Records. The last two tracks, "Loving You Means So Much to Me" and "Bring Back the Joy," were co-written by Payne's then-husband, Gregory Abbott, the latter of which was co-written by Payne herself. Four tracks were lifted from the album, "I Get (High on Your Memory)," "Bring Back the Joy," "Love Magnet," and "Feed Me Your Love." "Love Magnet" was the only one of the four that charted.

The album was re-released by a British label called Soulmusic.Com on July 26, 2011. The reissue contains three bonus tracks ("I Can't Live on a Memory," "Baby You've Got What It Takes," and "I Wanna See You Soon", a duet with the Tavares from their album Love Storm) and an essay about Payne's life and career during the recording and release of the album, which was written by David Nathan, founder of Soulmusic.com.

The song "I Get High (On Your Memory)" was sampled by rapper Styles P for his song "Good Times". The same track was also sampled by Irish rapper TCXL for his song “Just Add Weed”.   Also the title track was a cover of a song originally recorded by Australian singer Renée Geyer also released in 1977 off her album Moving Along (self-titled in the USA).

Track listing

CD bonus tracks
"I Can't Live on a Memory" - (Tony Camillo, Gregory Abbott) - 3:22
"Baby You've Got What It Takes" - (Tony Camillo, Gregory Abbott) - 2:56
"I Wanna See You Soon" (duet with Tavares) - (Keni St. Lewis, F. Perren) - 3:49

Personnel
Produced by: Frank E. Wilson for Spec-o-Lite Productions and Tony Camillo for Camillo-Marcucci Productions
Executive Producer: Larkin Arnold
Recorded at Crystal Sound Recording Studio
Recording Engineer: Kevin Beamish
Mastering Engineer: Jeff Sanders
Mixing Engineer: Kevin Beamish, Frank Wilson, David Henson

Musicians
Percussion: Jack Ashford, Bobbye Hall, Frederick Lewis
Synthesizer: Michael Boddicker
Keyboards: Reginald Burke, John Footman, Bruce Miller, Gregory Phillinganes, Josef Powell
Guitar: Clarence Drayton, Charles Fearing, Gregg Poree
Drums: Raymond Pounds
Bass: Nathan Watts (courtesy of Blackbull Productions)
Horns
Trumpets: Oscar Brashear, Chuck Findley, Steve Madio
Trombones: George Bohanon, George Thatcher
Saxophone: William Green, Ernest Watts, Terry Harrington (courtesy of Karma/A&M Records)
Strings and Horns: David Vandepitt on "Master of Love," "Love Magnet"; Bruce Miller on "Stares and Whispers," "Feed Me Your Love," "Loving You Means So Much to Me"
Background Vocals: Carolyn Dennis, Angela Winbush, Shirley Brewer, Gwen Matthews (courtesy of Blackbull Productions)
Legal Advisor: Raphael Tisdale
Special Thanks to the Crystal Kids
Art Direction: Roy Kohara
Photography: Charles Bush
Wardrobe by: Lady Madonna
Make-up and Hair Design: Björn

1977 albums
Freda Payne albums
Capitol Records albums